Rokeby is an unincorporated community in Lancaster County, Nebraska, United States.

History
A post office was established in Rokeby in 1894.  William Kennedy was the first postmaster. It remained in operation until it was discontinued in 1919. The community was likely named after the poem Rokeby by Walter Scott.

References

Unincorporated communities in Lancaster County, Nebraska
Unincorporated communities in Nebraska